Hans-Joachim Truppel (born 24 March 1951) is a German long-distance runner. He competed in the marathon at the 1980 Summer Olympics representing East Germany.

References

External links
 

1951 births
Living people
Athletes (track and field) at the 1980 Summer Olympics
German male long-distance runners
German male marathon runners
Olympic athletes of East Germany
Sportspeople from Thuringia
People from Saalfeld-Rudolstadt